Jacob Daniel Banta (born ) is an American politician and musician who currently represents the 4th District in the Pennsylvania House of Representatives since 2023. He is a member of the Republican Party.

Early life and career
Banta was born in Waterford, Pennsylvania, and grew up on his family's farm in LeBoeuf Township, Pennsylvania. Following graduation from Fort LeBoeuf High School in 1983, Banta enlisted in the United States Navy SEALs, from which he was honorably discharged. After the 9/11 attacks, Banta worked as a security contractor with the U.S. Department of Defense in the Middle East.

Political career
In 2022, Banta ran to represent the 4th District in the Pennsylvania House of Representatives, following the retirement of Curt Sonney. He won the six-person Republican primary election, and went on to defeat Democrat Chelsea Oliver in the general election.

Political positions

Abortion
Banta has described himself as "pro-life." He has previously said he does not support a ban on abortion, but has suggested he would be open to one which makes exceptions for rape, incest, and the life of the mother.

COVID-19
Banta opposed mandates put in place during the COVID-19 pandemic.  He has promoted using Ivermectin to treat COVID, despite there being no medical basis for the use of the drug in treating the disease. According to Banta, he was let go as a military contractor over his refusal to get the COVID-19 vaccine. Additionally Banta said he now regrets receiving other vaccinations that were required of him when joining the military.

COVID-related conspiracy theories
Banta has spoken of a "plandemic" conspiracy and claimed COVID-19 was created by Bill Gates, Anthony Fauci, and China as part of a globalist plot to depopulate the world. He also claims the COVID vaccine has killed more people than the virus itself.  In a Gab post, Banta claimed COVID test swabs, masks, and COVID vaccines contain lethal amounts of graphene oxide.

Election reforms
Banta supports the overturning of Pennsylvania's mail-in voting law.  He also supports voter ID, and advocates for the presence of serial numbers on ballots.

Promotion of conspiracy theories
Banta has used several social media sites, including Facebook, Gab, and Truth Social, to promote conspiracy theories and falsehoods sourced from various far-right websites. Some of his online comments caused his Facebook account to be suspended. He also claims the FBI visited his home in response to his rhetoric, a claim which has gone unverified. Banta additionally administers a 5,300-member private Facebook paged titled "I am America." Several members have posted QAnon content on the page. Although Banta himself has not posted QAnon content, several of his posts have similar language to QAnon conspiracy theories. 

Banta denies the result of the 2020 United States presidential election and claims it was stolen from President Donald Trump by Democrats. He also claims that Pennsylvania State Representatives Ryan Bizzarro won his 2020 election because of fraud.  There is no evidence to support either claim. Banta has claimed that the January 6 Capitol attack was orchestrated by Trump's political opponents to sabotage his career. At the same time, he has voiced support for those who attacked the Capitol building, referring to them as "patriots."

Banta has promoted the New World Order conspiracy theory, alleging mandates related to the COVID-19 pandemic, gun control, and "stolen" elections were part of a plot to establish a global Marxist state. The primary perpetrators of the New World Order, he claims, are the World Health Organization,  World Economic Forum, and Democratic politicians, including President Joe Biden.

Personal life
Banta is married to Shelly, and lives in LeBoeuf Township, Pennsylvania. He has three children and two grandchildren. Banta is the lead singer and guitarist in his band Jake's Blues, and preformed the national anthem at two of former President Donald Trump's rallies. Prior to that he recorded with the band Double Trouble.

Electoral history

References

Living people
Republican Party members of the Pennsylvania House of Representatives
21st-century American politicians
People from Waterford, Pennsylvania
People from Erie County, Pennsylvania
Year of birth missing (living people)
United States Navy SEALs personnel
COVID-19 conspiracy theorists